This is a list of notable Scottish Americans, including both immigrants who obtained U.S. citizenship and their American descendants.

To be included in this list, the person must have a Wikipedia article showing they are Scottish American or must have references showing they are Scottish American and are notable.

List

Artists

 Alexander Anderson, illustrator
 Earl W. Bascom, cowboy artist and sculptor
 Alexander Calder
 Herbert A. Collins
 John M. Donaldson, artist and architect
 Leslie Erganian
 John Mackie Falconer
 Joseph Glasco
 Tim Gunn
 Tommy Hilfiger, fashion designer
 Jackson Pollock, artist
 Arthur Fitzwilliam Tait

Business
 John D. Rockefeller 

 Alexander Graham Bell, founder of AT&T
 Philip Danforth Armour, founder of Armour and Company, a meatpacking firm
 William M. Blair
 Glen Bell, founder of Taco Bell
 David Dunbar Buick, founder of the Buick Motor Company
 William Wallace Cargill, son of a Scottish sea captain
 Andrew Carnegie, philanthropist and steel
 Jasper Newton "Jack" Daniel, founder of Jack Daniel's Tennessee whiskey distillery; Scottish-Welsh American; his grandmother, Elizabeth Callaway, was born in Scotland
 David Eccles, Utah's first ever millionaire
 John Malcolm Forbes
 John Murray Forbes
 William Cameron Forbes
 Jay Gould, railroad developer
 Archibald Gracie, shipping magnate
 W.K. Kellogg, industrialist, founder of the Kellogg Company
 Malco(l)m McLean, 'Father of Containerization'
 Cyrus McCormick, International Harvester
 Harold Fowler McCormick
 Ira O. McDaniel
 Rupert Murdoch, Australian-born chairman and director of NewsCorp
 Allan Pinkerton, detective and director of a security business
 Ross Perot, entrepreneur, founder of Electronic Data Systems and Perot Systems
 Alexander Turney Stewart, born in Ireland to Scottish parents
 Arch West, executive; developer of Doritos

Entertainment

 Jensen Ackles, Emmy-nominated actor, of part Scottish descent
 Ben Affleck, actor, writer, director, small amount of Scottish ancestry
 Casey Affleck, actor, small amount of Scottish ancestry
 Richard Dean Anderson, actor, mother is of Scottish ancestry
 Muriel Angelus
 Jennifer Aniston, maternal grandfather of part Scottish ancestry
 Karen Allen, film and stage actress
 Andrew Arbuckle
 Macklyn Arbuckle
 Roscoe Arbuckle
 Robert Armstrong
 Samaire Armstrong, actress best known for her roles in The O.C. and Dirty Sexy Money; father is Scottish
 Mary Astor
 Clara Bow, actress
 Harry Belafonte, actor, singer
 Lucille Ball, actress and comedian; father was part Scottish American
 Hailey Baldwin, model, television personality, small amount of Scottish ancestry
 Alison Brie, actress, of partial Scottish descent
 Tallulah Bankhead
 Al Barr
 Cate Blanchett, actress
 Patricia Breslin, actress
 Haley Bennett, actress, singer
 John Barrowman, born and semi-raised in Scotland
 Earl W. Bascom, descendant of John Alexander, Scottish settler who founded Alexandria, Virginia, worked with cowboy actor Roy Rogers
 Catherine Bell, actress and model, father was of Scottish descent
 Scott Clifton, actor, musician, of half Scottish ancestry
 Kristen Bell, actress, of part Scottish descent
 Alexis Bledel, actress, small amount of Scottish ancestry
 Jordana Brewster, actress, small amount of Scottish ancestry
 James Brolin, actor, small amount of Scottish ancestry
 Samantha Brown, television host on the Travel Channel
 James D. Brubaker, film producer, production manager and actor
 Gina Carano, mixed martial artist, small amount of Scottish ancestry
 Jim Carrey, small amount of Scottish ancestry
 Myra Carter
 Lacey Chabert, actress, small amount of Scottish ancestry
 Charles Coburn
 Chris Connelly, born in Edinburgh
 Keith Hirabayashi Cooke, actor and stuntman
 Miriam Cooper
 Stewart Copeland, drummer in the band The Police
 Laird Cregar
 Matt Damon, actor, father is of partial Scottish ancestry
 Ted Danson, actor, of part Scottish descent
 Mona Darkfeather
 Yvonne De Carlo, mother was of Italian and Scottish descent
 James Dean, actor, of part Scottish descent
 Laura Dern, actress, small amount of Scottish ancestry
 Vin Diesel, actor, small amount of Scottish ancestry
 Matt Dillon, small amount of Scottish ancestry
 Joanie Dodds, fashion model
 Shannen Doherty, actress, small amount of Scottish ancestry
 Helen Douglas
 Michael Douglas, small amount of Scottish ancestry
 Gary Dourdan, African-American actor with some Scottish ancestors (CSI: Crime Scene Investigation)
 Nancy Dow, actress, father was of part Scottish ancestry
 Robert Downey Jr., actor, small amount of Scottish ancestry on mother's side
 Hilary Duff, actress and singer
 Minnie Driver
 David Duchovny, actor (mother Scottish)
 Daniel Ducovny, brother of David (note, no "h")
 Robert Duvall, small amount of Scottish ancestry
 Leslie Easterbrook, actor, of partial Scottish descent
 Clint Eastwood, actor and instructor, of partial Scottish ancestry
 Aaron Eckhart, actor, mother is of partial Scottish ancestry
 George Eldredge
 Craig Ferguson, actor and comedian
 George Ferguson
 Tina Fey, comedic actress and writer; father half German and half Scottish heritage
 Jane Fonda, actress, writer, producer
 Jimmy Finlayson
 Scott Foley, actor, small amount of Scottish ancestry
 China Forbes, lead singer of Pink Martini; father Scottish American, mother African-American
 Glenn Ford
 Edwin Forrest
 Drew Fuller
 Judy Garland (Milne from Aberdeenshire), of part Scottish ancestry
 Lauren Graham, actress
 Greer Garson, actress
 Ashlyn Gere
 Paul Giamatti, actor, small amount of Scottish ancestry
 Isabel Gillies
 Brian Austin Green
 Andy Griffith, comedian, actor and singer best known for The Andy Griffith Show
 Rebecca Hall, actress, small amount of Scottish ancestry
 Oliver Hardy, comedic actor, best known for Laurel and Hardy
 Roy Ellsworth Harris, classical composer of Scottish, Irish, and Welsh ancestry
 Colton Haynes, actor, small amount of Scottish ancestry
 Katharine Hepburn, small amount of Scottish ancestry
 Charlton Heston, small amount of Scottish ancestry 
 Paris Hilton, actress, model, of partial Scottish ancestry
 Edward Everett Horton
 Ron Howard, small amount of Scottish ancestry
 Steve Howey
 Felicity Huffman, actress, small amount of Scottish ancestry
 Anjelica Huston, her father, director John Huston, was of part Scottish descent
 Josh Hutcherson, small amount of Scottish ancestry
 Jonathan Jackson, actor, small amount of Scottish ancestry
 Caitlyn Jenner, small amount of Scottish ancestry
 Kendall Jenner, of partial Scottish ancestry
 Kris Jenner, of partial Scottish ancestry
 Kylie Jenner, of partial Scottish ancestry
 Spike Jonze, director, producer, screenwriter and actor, small amount of Scottish ancestry
 Khloé Kardashian, of partial Scottish ancestry
 Kim Kardashian, of partial Scottish ancestry
 Kourtney Kardashian, of partial Scottish ancestry
 Rob Kardashian, of partial Scottish ancestry
 Cody Kasch, television actor (Desperate Housewives)
 Max Kasch, television and film actor
 Michael Keaton, small amount of Scottish ancestry
 David Keith, actor
 Anna Kendrick, actress, mother is of Scottish descent
 Deborah Kerr, actress
 Val Kilmer, actor, small amount of Scottish ancestry
 Nancy Kwan, mother was of Scottish descent
 Sunny Lane, porn star 
 Brie Larson, actress, filmmaker  
 Eva LaRue, actress, model
 Jennifer Lawrence, actress
 Jay Leno, comedian, former actor, host of The Tonight Show; mother was from west lowland Scotland
 Hamish Linklater, best known for his role in the series The New Adventures of Old Christine; son of Scottish vocal coach, dialect professor, actor and theater director Kristin Linklater
 Ray Liotta, actor
 Marion Lorne, actress best known for her recurring role as Aunt Clara in the series Bewitched
 Julia Louis-Dreyfus, actress, small amount of Scottish ancestry
 Chad Lowe, actor, small amount of Scottish ancestry
 Myrna Loy
 Kate McKinnon, actress, comedian, of half Scottish ancestry
 Karen McDougal, model, actress
 Jeanette MacDonald, actress and singer
 Andie MacDowell, small amount of Scottish ancestry
 Seth MacFarlane, writer of Family Guy, of partial Scottish ancestry
 Ali MacGraw, father was of Scottish descent, mother was of Hungarian Jewish ancestry
 Alexander Mackendrick
 Kyle MacLachlan, actor (Twin Peaks), paternal grandfather was of Scottish ancestry
 Patrick Macnee, actor
 Michael Madsen, actor, small amount of Scottish ancestry
 Virginia Madsen, actress, small amount of Scottish ancestry
 John Malkovich, small amount of Scottish ancestry
 Matthew McConaughey, of part Scottish descent
 Ross McCorkell, drag queen known as Rosé, born in Scotland
 Gates McFadden, actress
 Danica McKellar, actress
 Benjamin McKenzie, of part Scottish ancestry
 Kevin McKidd
 Zoe McLellan
 Wendi McLendon-Covey, actress
 Steve McQueen, actor, mother and father both of Scottish descent
 Steven R. McQueen, actor, small amount of Scottish ancestry
 Caroline McWilliams
 Donald Meek, actor
 Marian Mercer, actress
 Andy Milligan
 Cameron Mitchell
 John Cameron Mitchell, mother is native Scottish
 Demi Moore, actress, mother is Scottish
 Julianne Moore, actress, mother is from Scotland
 Agnes Moorehead
 Marilyn Monroe, actress
 Elizabeth Montgomery, actress
 Robert Montgomery, film and television actor, director and producer; father of actress Elizabeth Montgomery
 Jennifer Morrison, father is of Scottish descent
 Jim Morrison, singer/songwriter of The Doors
 Sean Murray, Australian mother and Australian-American father, both of Scottish ancestry
 Timothy Olyphant, actor; his surname is a variant spelling of the Scottish Clan Oliphant
 Mary-Louise Parker, actress, small amount of Scottish ancestry
 Aaron Paul, small amount of Scottish ancestry
 Sara Paxton, father is of part Scottish ancestry
 Nia Peeples, actress and singer
 Lou Diamond Phillips, biological father was of mostly Scottish descent
 Freddie Prinze Jr., actor, small amount of Scottish ancestry
 Margaret Qualley, actress
 Rachael Ray, television personality, chef
 Burt Reynolds, small amount of Scottish ancestry
 Jason Ritter, actor, small amount of Scottish ancestry
 AnnaSophia Robb, of part Scottish descent
 Amber Rose, model, actress, mother is of half Scottish descent
 Emma Roberts, small amount of Scottish ancestry
 Julia Roberts, small amount of Scottish ancestry
 Sarah Roemer, small amount of Scottish ancestry
 Ginger Rogers, actress; born Virginia Katherine McMath
 Mickey Rooney, actor, father was Scottish-born
 Brandon Routh, small amount of Scottish ancestry
 Jane Russell
 George C. Scott, actor
 Seann William Scott, actor, Steve Stifler of American Pie, of part Scottish ancestry
 Brooke Shields, small amount of Scottish ancestry
 Alicia Silverstone, actress, mother is Scottish
 Barbara Stanwick, small amount of Scottish ancestry
 Jimmy Stewart, actor, Brigadier General (USAFR)
 John Stewart, musician
 Emma Stone, actress, of part Scottish descent
 David Strathairn, actor, The River Wild, of part Scottish ancestry
 Donald Sutherland, actor, of part Scottish descent
 Kiefer Sutherland, actor, of mostly Scottish descent
 Michael Tait, musician
 Kate Upton, actress, model, of partial Scottish ancestry, Great-grandmother is of Scottish ancestry
 Casper Van Dien, small amount of Scottish ancestry
 Milo Ventimiglia, small amount of Scottish ancestry
 Jurgen Vsych, film director, screenwriter and author
 Christopher Walken, actor; mother was a Scottish immigrant
 Kerry Washington, actress, small amount of Scottish ancestry
 John Wayne, actor (both parents of part Scottish and Scots-Irish ancestry)
 Sigourney Weaver, actress, father was of part Scottish ancestry
 Kristen Wiig, small amount of Scottish ancestry
 Olivia Wilde, actress, small amount of Scottish ancestry
 Michelle Williams, actress, small amount of Scottish ancestry
 Patrick Wilson, small amount of Scottish ancestry
 Katherine Waterston, actress
 Reese Witherspoon, actress; Scottish ancestor John D. Witherspoon signed the Declaration of Independence
 Steven Wright, comedian, actor and writer; Scottish and Italian descent
 Alan Young, Film and Television Actor and voice actor
 Joe Yule, comedian, burlesque and motion pictures
 Cyma Zarghami, current president of Nickelodeon and MTV's Kids and Family Group (father Iranian, mother Scottish)
 Zendaya, actress, singer (mother is of part Scottish descent)

Government and military

 Creighton Abrams, U.S. Army general, commanded military operations in Vietnam from 1968–1972
 John Adair
 Edwin "Buzz" Aldrin, U.S. Air Force pilot and astronaut, second man to walk on the moon in 1969 on Apollo 11. First mission into space was Gemini 12 in 1966.
 William Alexander, major-general during the American Revolutionary War
 John Anderson, colonial governor of New Jersey in 1736
 Matthew Arbuckle, general, closely identified with the Indian Territory (Oklahoma) for the last thirty years of his life; commanded Fort Smith near Indian Territory; established Forts Gibson and Towson in Indian Territory
 Neil Armstrong, Naval aviator and astronaut, first man to walk on the moon in 1969 on Apollo 11. First mission into space was Gemini 8 in 1966.
 Chester A. Arthur, American president
 John S. Barbour Jr.
 Maryanne Trump Barry, Judge
 Alan Bean, astronaut and fourth person to walk on the moon in 1969 on Apollo 12
 James B. Beck
 Austin Blair
 Sherrod Brown, Democratic Senator of Ohio
 Jim Bowie, frontiersman and a defender of the Alamo
 Omar N. Bradley, general
 John Breathitt
 George A. Bruce
 Albert Bryant Jr.
 Bay Buchanan
 Pat Buchanan
 Irvine Bulloch
 Ambrose Burnside
 Joseph R. Burton
 George H. W. Bush, 41st president of the United States
 George W. Bush, 43rd President of the United States
 Jeb Bush, former Republican governor of Florida
 John C. Caldwell
 Archibald Campbell
 Bill Campbell
 George W. Campbell
 John B. T. Campbell III
 Thomas Mitchell Campbell
 William Joseph Campbell
 Wooda Nicholas Carr
 Kit Carson
 Richard Caswell
 Chris Christie, former Republican governor of New Jersey
 William Claflin, Governor of Massachusetts
 George Rogers Clark
 Grover Cleveland, 22nd and 24th President of the United States
 Hillary Clinton, former U.S. Senator and First Lady of the United States, mother is of Scottish ancestry
 Jack Coghill
 Merian C. Cooper
 Samuel W. Crawford, U.S. Army surgeon and Union general in the American Civil War
 Davy Crockett, frontiersman, U.S. Congressman and a defender of the Alamo
 Marcus Henderson Cruikshank
 Alexander J. Dallas
 George M. Dallas, Vice president of the United States, US Senator from Pennsylvania, Mayor of Philadelphia and Secretary of the Treasury. US Minister to Court of St. James and Russia
 Howard Dean, Governor of Vermont
 John Edwards
 James E. Ferguson
 Millard Fillmore, 13th President of the United States
 William Fleming
 James Florio, Governor of New Jersey
 John B. Frazier
 John Kenneth Galbraith, economist
 Alexander Garden, American Revolutionary War soldier
 James Lorraine Geddes
 James Gilfillan, 13th Treasurer of the United States
 Henry Bell Gilkeson
 Newt Gingrich, former U.S. Congressman and Speaker of the House.
 John Glenn, former U.S. Senator from Ohio, Marine Corps aviator and astronaut; first American to orbit the earth, Mercury/Friendship 7
 John B. Gordon, Confederate general
 Arthur F. Gorham, World War II paratrooper and hero during the invasion of Sicily
 Archibald Gracie III
 Kirsten Gillibrand, U.S. Senator from New York
 Ulysses S. Grant, 18th President of the United States, Union Army General, 1864 promoted to Lieutenant General and Commander of all the Union armies in American Civil War.
 Charles McNeill Gray
 Robert Gray
 William Halsey Jr., Fleet Admiral during World War II in the Pacific theater
 Alexander Hamilton, first Secretary of the Treasury
 John Hancock, president of the Second Continental Congress and was the first and third Governor of the Commonwealth of Massachusetts and first signatory of the United States Declaration of Independence, known for his large signature
 Steny Hoyer, Democratic House Majority leader in the 116th Congress, and a U.S. representative from Maryland's 5th congressional district
 Warren G. Harding, 29th President of the United States
 Rutherford B. Hayes, 19th President of the United States. Colonel of the 23rd Ohio in the American Civil War, Later Brevetted to Brigadier General then Major General during the Civil War
 George Hairston, politician
 Robert Hairston, politician, military officer
 Patrick Henry, Revolutionary War officer, colonel of the 1st Virginia Infantry, known for the "give me liberty, or give me death!" speech
 Harold G. Hoffman, Governor of New Jersey
 William Hooper
 Sam Houston, 1st and 3rd president of Texas and later 7th governor of Texas, 6th Governor of Tennessee 1827–1829, US Congressman from Tennessee and US Senator from Texas. Major General in the Texas Revolution. Defeated Santa Anna at Battle of San Jacinto. Opposed secession and remained loyal to the Union during the Civil War.
 John Houstoun
 Rufus Ingalls
 James Iredell Jr., Governor of North Carolina
 Thomas Jefferson, 3rd President of the United States
 Samuel Johnston
 John Paul Jones, Scottish-born, American Revolutionary War naval officer, American Admiral and Rear Admiral in the Imperial Russian Navy
 Tim Kaine, US Senator from Virginia
 John Kerry, former US Senator from Massachusetts, 2004 Democratic presidential nominee, US Secretary of State in Obama Administration
 Henry Latimer
 Roberta Lawson
 Hugh Swinton Legaré, lawyer and politician of Huguenot and Scottish ancestry
 Edward Livingston
 Matthew B. Lowrie
 Dan Lungren
 Nathaniel Lyon, American general, first Union general killed in the Civil War in 1861 at the Battle of Wilson's Creek
 Arthur MacArthur Jr., Union officer during the Civil War, American general, father of General Douglas MacArthur
 Douglas MacArthur, five-star American Army General in the Pacific theater during World War II and commander of American forces in Korean War
 John Lewis MacDonald
 Clark MacGregor
 Archibald T. MacIntyre, politician
 George MacKinnon
 Franklin MacVeagh
 Duncan McArthur
 Tom McClintock
 Henry Dickerson McDaniel, Governor of Georgia
 James McDivitt, Brig Gen, USAF, Ret., former astronaut, test pilot and aeronautical engineer who flew in the Gemini 4 and Apollo 9 missions
 Irvin McDowell, American general, commanded Union forces at the First Battle of Bull Run (First Manassas)
 Samuel McDowell
 George B. McClellan, Union major general during the American Civil War; Democratic presidential nominee in 1864; later Governor of New Jersey; organized the Army of the Potomac; served briefly (November 1861 to March 1862) as the general-in-chief of the Union Army
 Robert Mueller, lawyer and government official
 Scott McClellan, former White House press secretary
 John J. McCloy
 Lachlan McIntosh
 Mike McIntyre
 Kenneth McKellar
 Alexander McKenzie
 William McKinley, 25th President of the United States, 3rd US President to be assassinated in 1901 on the grounds of the Pan-American Exposition at the Temple of Music in Buffalo, New York. McKinley was the last president to have served in the American Civil War.
 John McLane
 Mack McLarty
 James C. McLaughlin
 Robert McNamara, U.S. Defense Secretary and President of the World Bank
 Dan K. McNeill, American general
 David Brydie Mitchell, Governor of Georgia
 Walter Mondale, U.S. Senator from Minnesota, 1984 Democratic presidential nominee
 James Monroe, 4th President of the United States
 George Stephen Morrison, United States Navy rear admiral (upper half) and naval aviator, father of Jim Morrison, the lead singer of the rock band The Doors
 Thomas Z. Morrow, Colonel of the 32nd Kentucky Infantry during the American Civil War
 William Moultrie
 Patty Murray Democratic United States Senator from Washington
 Hugh Nelson
 Francis G. Newlands
 Gavin Newsom
 Samuel D. Nicholson
 Barack Obama, 44th President of the United States, first Black president of the United States, elected in 2008
 David Paterson
 George S. Patton, American general, commanded troops in North Africa and in Europe during World War 2
 Thomas Baldwin Peddie
 James K. Polk, 11th president of the United States
 Colin Powell, former U.S. general and Chairman of the Joint Chiefs of Staff, US Secretary of State
 Marilyn Quayle, lawyer, wife of former vice president of the United States Dan Quayle; former second Lady of the United States
 Samuel Ralston, Governor of Indiana and US Senator
 Ronald Reagan, 40th president of United States, governor of California
 Jim Risch
 Mitt Romney, Governor of Massachusetts and 2012 Republican presidential nominee
 Theodore Roosevelt, 26th president of the United States, Former vice president of the United States, Governor of New York
 Winfield Scott, general, veteran of War of 1812, commanded American Army of Occupation during the Mexican–American War in battles, i.e. Cerro Gordo and Chapultepec
 Alan Shepard, Naval aviator and astronaut; first American in space and fifth man to walk on the moon, Apollo 14
 George Spalding
 John C. Stennis, U.S. Senator from Mississippi
 Ted Stevens, U.S. Senator from Alaska, U.S. Attorney & Solicitor of Interior
 Jeb Stuart, Confederate cavalry general; commanded the cavalry corps in Lee's Army of Northern Virginia; killed at Battle of Yellow Tavern
 William Howard Taft, 27th president of the United States, Chief Justice of the United States, United States Secretary of War, 1st Provisional Governor of Cuba, Governor-General of the Philippines, Judge of the United States Court of Appeals for the Sixth Circuit, United States Solicitor General
 Edward Telfair, Governor of Georgia
 David P. Thompson
 George Troup, Governor of Georgia
 Donald Trump, 45th president of the United States
 James Webb, U. S. Senator, author of Born Fighting: How the Scots-Irish Shaped America (2004)
 Alexander White
 Heather Wilson
 Malcolm Wilson
 Woodrow Wilson, 28th president of the United States
 Henry A. Wise, Confederate Brigadier General and Governor of Virginia
 John Witherspoon, Scots Presbyterian minister and signatory of the United States Declaration of Independence

Inventors, engineers, and academics

 Thomas Addis, physician and scientist
 Sextus Barbour
 Earl W. Bascom, inventor of rodeo equipment
 Alexander Graham Bell, inventor of the telephone
 Alexander Melville Bell
 James Blair, founder of the College of William and Mary
 Walter Houser Brattain, inventor of the transistor
 George Harold Brown
 James McGill Buchanan, economist
 Nicholas Murray Butler
 Joseph Campbell, professor of comparative mythology
 William Wallace Campbell, astronomer
 Allan McLeod Cormack
 Donald J. Cram, shared the 1987 Nobel Prize in Chemistry with Jean-Marie Lehn and Charles J. Pedersen
 Alexander Garden, botanist; namesake of gardenia flower; physician and zoologist
 William Harkness
 Irving Langmuir
 David MacAdam, color scientist
 James Ross MacDonald, physicist
 Kevin B. MacDonald, psychology professor at California State University
 Colin Munro MacLeod
 Katherine McAlpine
 Richard Sears McCulloh
 Andrew Cunningham McLaughlin, historian
 Robert Burns Woodward, Nobel Prize-winning chemist

Musicians and singers
David Gunn, rapper and singer songwriter for American band KING 810

 Billie Joe Armstrong, singer and guitarist for Green Day
 Billie Eilish, singer-songwriter
 Tim Armstrong, lead singer and guitarist for Rancid
 Emilie Autumn
 Joan Baez, singer-songwriter and activist; her mother was born in Edinburgh
 Jeff Baxter, guitarist for Steely Dan
 Shannon Bex, former member of Danity Kane
 Wes Borland, of the band Limp Bizkit
 Roy Buchanan, guitarist and blues musician; a pioneer of the Telecaster sound
 David Byrne, musician, singer-songwriter of the band Talking Heads, born in Dumbarton
 David Campbell
 Glen Campbell, singer
 Aaron Carter, singer
 Nick Carter, singer
 Johnny Cash, singer
 Rosanne Cash, singer-songwriter; daughter of Johnny Cash
 Kurt Cobain, American musician who was the lead singer, guitarist, and primary songwriter of the rock band Nirvana, of partial Scottish ancestry
 Alice Cooper, rock singer
 Brann Dailor, drummer for Mastodon
 Glen Danzig, singer known for work with Misfits and Danzig
 Jonathan Davis, lead singer and songwriter for Korn
 Stacy "Fergie" Ferguson, singer best known as part of The Black Eyed Peas
 Lana Del Rey, singer-songwriter; father and mother of Scottish descent/ancestry; family roots in Lanarkshire
 Brandon Flowers, singer and keyboardist of The Killers
 Dan Fogelberg, singer-songwriter and multi-instrumentalist
 Alison Fraser
 Kim Gordon, singer/guitarist for Sonic Youth
 Kina Grannis
 Langston Hughes, African-American musician with some Scottish ancestry
 Oscar Hammerstein II, writer of musicals of "Rodgers and Hammerstein" fame, Scottish grandparent
 Gil-Scott Heron, African-American musician with some Scottish ancestry
 James Hetfield, singer/rhythm guitarist of Metallica
 Faith Hill
 John S. Hilliard, composer
 Brent Hinds, singer/guitarist for Mastodon
 David Homyk
 Alan Hovhaness
 Alicia Keys, mother of Scottish descent
 Chris Kirkpatrick, former member of N'Sync
 Amy Lee, lead singer of Evanescence
 Joanna Levesque, better known by her stage name JoJo
 Tony MacAlpine, African American guitarist with Scottish ancestry
 Adam MacDougall
 Ian MacKaye, early hardcore and emo personality, noted for Minor Threat and Fugazi
 Talitha MacKenzie, singer
 Marshall "Eminem" Mathers, rapper 
 Mandy Moore, singer
 Tim McAllister
 Jesse McCartney, singer
 Paul McCoy
 Country Joe McDonald, lead singer of the 1960s psychedelic rock group Country Joe and the Fish
 Tim McGraw, country music singer; father is Scots-Irish, mother is Italian-Irish
 Ray McKinley
 Jon McLaughlin, singer-songwriter
 Don McLean
 Katharine McPhee, pop and R&B musician
 Ed McTaggart
 Meat Loaf
 Johnny Mercer
 Brian Molko, lead singer of Placebo(mother Scottish)
 Jim Morrison, singer, poet; father and mother of Scottish descent
 Michael Nesmith, musician, actor, The Monkees
 Mike Ness, guitarist and songwriter in the band Social Distortion
 Wayne Newton, singer
 Brad Paisley, country music singer
 Tom Petty, guitarist and vocalist in the band Tom Petty and the Heartbreakers
 Elvis Presley, singer
 Bonnie Raitt, singer-songwriter
 John Raitt, Broadway musical star
 Doug Robb, musician and lead singer of rock band Hoobastank
 Axl Rose, lead singer from Guns and Roses; of Scottish German descent
 Ryan Ross, musician, previously with Panic! at the Disco and now with The Young Veins
 Hillary Scott, singer-songwriter
 Jessica Simpson, singer
 Layne Staley, original lead singer of Alice in Chains
 Gwen Stefani, singer
 Izzy Stradlin, rock musician
 Taylor Swift, country/pop singer
 Carrie Underwood, singer-songwriter, and actress
 Brendon Urie, lead singer of Panic! at the Disco
 Gene Vincent, rockabilly singer
 Kate Voegele, singer
 Tom Waits, singer-songwriter
 Sheila Walsh, Christian singer
 Gerard Way, lead singer of My Chemical Romance
 Mikey Way, bass guitarist for My Chemical Romance
 Jack White aka John Anthony Gillis, of The White Stripes

Native American leaders

 Alexander McGillivray, Creek (Muscogee) chief
 William McIntosh, Creek (Muscogee) military leader
 Peter McQueen, Creek (Muscogee) military leader
 Menawa, Creek (Muscogee) military leader
 John Norton, Mohawk chief
 John Ross, Cherokee chief
 William Weatherford, Creek (Muscogee) military leader

Religion

 John Fulton, Episcopal priest, journalist, and author
 George Grant
 John Menzies Macfarlane, hymn writer
 Mike MacIntosh
 David O. McKay, ninth president of The Church of Jesus Christ of Latter-day Saints (LDS Church), Scottish father
 Scotty McLennan
 Pat Robertson, founder and host of the 700 Club
 Joseph Smith, founder of the Latter Day Saint movement, through his mother Lucy Mack Smith

Sports

 Robert Archibald, first Scottish NBA player
 Tommy Armour III, professional golfer
 Earl W. Bascom, rodeo pioneer, hall of fame inductee, "Father of Modern Rodeo"
 Don Budge, tennis player
 Gordon Burness
 Roy Carlyle
 Mickey Cochrane, Hall of Famer
 Jason Castro, MLB player for Minnesota Twins
 Keith Cooke, martial artist (mother Scottish American, father Japanese American)
 Meryl Davis, ice skater
 Walter Dick, soccer player
 Julian Edelman, professional football player
 Brandon Forsyth, ice skater
 Patrick Galbraith
 Tony Gonzalez, former professional football player, father is of part Scottish ancestry
 Jimmy Gallagher, soccer player who was inducted into the National Soccer Hall of Fame
 Malcolm Goldie, soccer player who won one cap for the US national team
 Drew Galloway, professional wrestler
 Hulk Hogan, former professional wrestler
 John Harkes
 Dan Henderson, wrestler
 Josh Hamilton, Texas Rangers outfielder
 Jack Hobens, golfer
 Euan Holden, American soccer player currently playing for Danish team Vejle BK
 Stuart Holden, US international soccer player, currently playing for Houston Dynamo
 April Hunter, professional wrestler
 Jock Hutchison
 Chris Jericho, professional wrestler
 Dominic Kinnear, US international soccer player and current head coach of Houston Dynamo, born in Glasgow
 Bob MacDonald, former Major League Baseball player
 Danny MacFayden, baseball player
 Arthur Matsu, football player 
 Mac McClung, basketball player
 Seth McClung
 Charlie McCully, soccer player who won 11 caps for the US national team
 Brandon McDonald
 Shaun McDonald, American football player
 Tommy McFarlane
 Parker McLachlin
 Jason McLaughlin, soccer player
 Fred McLeod
 Nate McLouth, baseballer currently playing for the Atlanta Braves
 Doug McMillan
 Jamie McMurray
 Tommy Morrison, boxer
 James Naismith, Canadian-born innovator, invented the game of basketball, member of the Naismith Memorial Basketball Hall of Fame & FIBA Hall of Fame
 Joe Ogilvie
 Arnold Palmer, golfer
 Michael Phelps
 Roddy Piper, wrestler
 Frank Ramsey
Aaron Rodgers
 Jock Sutherland, American football player and coach
 Bobby Thomson, baseball player
 Lawrence Tynes, NFL Player
 J. J. Watt, NFL Player for Houston Texans
 Rube Waddell, Hall of Fame pitcher

Writers

 Helen Adam
 Louis Auchincloss
 Paul Dayton Bailey
 Lesley Bannatyne
 Hugh Henry Brackenridge, writer
 Carol Brink
 Fredric Brown, short story writer
 Erskine Caldwell
 Taylor Caldwell
 John Dickson Carr
 Michael Crichton, author
 Laurie York Erskine
 William Faulkner, author
 Alex Finlayson
 B. C. Forbes, journalist and author who founded Forbes magazine
 Esther Forbes, novelist and children's writer
 Robert Frost, poet
 Cork Graham, author; imprisoned in Vietnam for trespassing while looking for treasure buried by Captain Kidd
 Alex Haley, author of Roots
 Alice Henderson
 Robert E. Howard, author of the Conan fantasy series
 Washington Irving
 Garrison Keillor, author, storyteller, humorist, and radio personality; host of the Minnesota Public Radio show A Prairie Home Companion
 Steven Keillor
 Will Leitch
 Amy MacDonald
 Sally MacKenzie
 Norman Maclean, author of A River Runs Through It
 Archibald MacLeish, modernist poet, Pulitzer Prize winner and Librarian of Congress
 Sean McAdam
 Helen McCloy
 David McCullough
 Richard McCulloch
 Dennis McDougal
 Al McIntosh, distinguished newspaper editor
 Larry McMurty
 Judith McNaught
 James Alan McPherson
 Herman Melville
 Edgar Allan Poe, short story writer, poet and critic
 J. D. Salinger, writer of The Catcher in the Rye
 Phyllis Schlafly, politically conservative, anti-abortion activist and writer
 Upton Sinclair, Pulitzer Prize–winning author
 Mark Twain, author
 Thomas Clayton Wolfe, author whose mother was Scots-Irish

Other

 Tom Bendelow
 Alfred Blalock, surgeon
 Catherine Wolfe Bruce
 Pat Buchanan, paleoconservative political commentator, nativist, author, syndicated columnist, politician, and broadcaster; former conservative host of CNN Crossfire
 Erin Burnett, CNN news anchor; maternal great-grandfather was a Scottish immigrant
 Mary Katherine Campbell (1905–1990), Miss America titleholder 1922 and 1923, first runner-up in 1924
 Butch Cassidy
 William Sloane Coffin
 Virgil Earp
 Wyatt Earp
 Mary Baker Eddy, founder of the Christian Science movement
 William Henry Farquhar
 Jenna Bush Hager, journalist, news personality, author
 Ilan Hall, chef
 Arlo Hemphill
 Doc Holliday, gambler,
 Indiana Jones, fictional archeologist, associate dean, college professor, adventurer and soldier
 Kennedy, political commentator for Fox News
 Lincoln Loud, fictional character, main protagonist in the Nickelodeon animated series The Loud House
 Barbour Lathrop
 Malcolm X, militant and religious leader
 Flora MacDonald (emigrated to America after failure of Jacobite rising of 1745)
 Ranald MacDonald, first person to teach the English language in Japan
 Catharine MacKinnon
 Jane McCrea
 George Henry Mackenzie
 Lisa McPherson, Scientologist whose death was a source of much controversy for the Church of Scientology
 Lee Miller
 David Muir, television journalist. His paternal great-grandfather was Scottish
 John Muir, naturalist
 Charlie Rose, television journalist, talk show host
 Trump Family
 Barron, youngest child of Donald Trump
 Don Jr, businessman, philanthropist
 Eric, businessman, philanthropist
 Ivanka, businesswoman, author, fashion designer
 Mary Anne MacLeod Trump, philanthropist and mother of Donald Trump
 Tiffany, socialite, model

See also
 List of Scots
 Scottish Canadians

References

External links
 Scottish Americans
 Website of An Comunn Gáidhealach Ameireaganach

Scottish Americans
Scottish
Americans